Northern Virginia Magazine is a monthly magazine for the Northern Virginia region and the Washington, D.C. metropolitan area. 

The magazine published its first issue in 2006. It focuses on dining, shopping, travel, and entertainment in the Northern Virginia area and frequently produces "best of" lists, including the annual Best of NoVA list.

Editorial Content 

As of July 2021, the magazine is divided into seven departments: NoVA Now, Datebook, The Good Life, Features, Home & Design, Taste, and Last Look.

NoVA Now, Datebook, and The Good Life are at the front of the magazine. NoVA Now features news from Northern Virginia. Datebook contains upcoming events. The Good Life contains information on shopping and healthy practices. 

Features are in the middle of the publication and include a range of topics from Northern Virginia notables to politics, in-depth looks at news affecting the region, travel itineraries, and "Best of" lists.

Home & Design is in the back of the book and contains interior decorating tips and expert interviews.

Taste features in-depth restaurant reviews by restaurant critic, Alice Levitt.

Last Look, on the last page of the magazine, and features a Q&A with an important person from Northern Virginia.

Daily editorial content is available online at the magazine's website covering culture, food, style, home, family, health, and things to do.

Circulation 
Northern Virginia Magazine has a total readership of 150,000 each month and is published 12 times a year. The magazine has won 14 Virginia Press Association awards.

Leadership 
As of May 2022, the editor of Northern Virginia Magazine is Amy Ayres. Previous editors include Kelly Kendall, Katie Bianco, and Lynn Norusis, who stepped down after nine years at the helm of the magazine.

Northern Virginia Magazine's CEO is Sang Yang and the president and publisher is Darin Baird.

References

External links

Northern Virginia Magazine Official website

2006 establishments in Virginia
Monthly magazines published in the United States
Local interest magazines published in the United States
Magazines established in 2006
Magazines published in Virginia
Listings magazines